Pundt's tuco-tuco (Ctenomys pundti) is a species of rodent in the family Ctenomyidae. It is endemic to the Pampas of southern Córdoba and San Luis Provinces in central Argentina. The species is named after Argentine landowner and collector Moritz Pundt. It has a fragmented population and is threatened by conversion of its habitat to agricultural use.

References

Mammals of Argentina
Tuco-tucos
Endemic fauna of Argentina
Mammals described in 1900